Ștefan Dumitru Nanu (born 8 September 1968, in Filiași) is a Romanian former footballer and current manager. He played as a defender.

External links
 
 
 

1968 births
Living people
Romanian footballers
Romania international footballers
Romanian expatriate footballers
FCV Farul Constanța players
FC Rapid București players
SBV Vitesse players
FC Steaua București players
Eredivisie players
Liga I players
FC Vaslui players
ASC Oțelul Galați players
Expatriate footballers in the Netherlands
Romanian expatriate sportspeople in the Netherlands
People from Filiași
Association football defenders
Romanian football managers
FC Petrolul Ploiești managers
CS Minerul Motru managers
ACS Poli Timișoara managers
FCV Farul Constanța managers
CSM Deva managers